The Finnish national road 45 is the 2nd class main route between the major cities of Helsinki and Hyvinkää in southern Finland. It runs from Käpylä in Helsinki to the Hyrylä in Tuusula as a motorway called Tuusula Highway, where it continues to border of the Hyvinkää town and the national road 3 as a smaller road called Hämeentie.

Route 

The road passes through the following localities:
Helsinki (Käpylä and Pakila)
Vantaa (Tammisto and Koivuhaka)
Tuusula (Ruotsinkylä, Hyrylä and Rusutjärvi)
Nurmijärvi (Nukari)
Hyvinkää

References

External links

Roads in Finland
Transport in Helsinki
Transport in Vantaa